Bartolo di Fredi (c. 1330 – 26 January 1410), also called Bartolo Battiloro, was an Italian painter, born in Siena, classified as a member of the Sienese School.

Biography
He had a large studio and was one of the most influential painters working in Siena and the surrounding towns in the second half of the fourteenth century. He registered in the Guild of that city in 1355; he had several children, who all died before him, with the exception of Andrea di Bartolo.

He was the companion of Andrea Vanni from 1353, and helped decorate the Hall of Council at Siena, in 1361. From 1356 he worked in the Collegiata, or principal church, of San Gimignano, some 30 km from Siena, where he painted the entire side of the left aisle with a cycle of frescoes of Scenes from the Old Testament; the completed work was signed and dated in 1367. In 1366 the Council of the city of Gimignano ordered a painting, representing Two Monks of the Augustine Order to be placed in the Palazzo Pubblico, in order to commemorate the settlement of some disputes which had long existed between that order and the city.

In the early part of 1367 he was employed, along with Giacomo di Mino, in the decoration of the Cathedral of Siena. In 1372 he rose to a position in the government of the city, and was sent to welcome the new Podestà on his approach to Siena. In 1381 he was himself made a member of the Council.

In 1382 he executed the Descent from the Cross now in the Sacristy of San Francesco, Montalcino. The same church also possesses panels painted by him containing the Baptism of Christ, figures of SS. Peter, Paul, and Francis, and five scenes from the Life of St Philip of Montalcino. In 1389, Bartolo, assisted by Luca Thome, painted the altar-piece for the Shoemakers' Company, in the Cathedral of Siena, and continued from that year until his death to furnish altar-pieces for the cathedral and other churches of Siena, which have now all disappeared.

His style is marked by the rejection of the concrete figures associated with Pietro Lorenzetti to instead favor flatter decorative otherworldly compositions in the manner of Simone Martini and Duccio.  He combined a spirit of fantasy with anecdotal details.

The Honolulu Museum of Art, the Los Angeles County Museum of Art, the Louvre, the National Museum of Serbia, the Metropolitan Museum of Art, the Musée des beaux-arts de Chambéry, the Musée du Petit Palais, Avignon, the Museo Civico e Diocesano d'Arte Sacra of Montalcino, the church of San Francesco, Lucignano, the Museum of Fine Arts, Boston and the Fralin Museum of Art are among the public collections having paintings by Bartolo di Fredi.

Gallery

References

External links
Web Gallery of Art

Further reading
 (see index; plate 13)

1410 deaths
1330s births
14th-century Italian painters
Italian male painters
15th-century Italian painters
Trecento painters
Painters from Siena
Gothic painters
Fresco painters
Catholic painters